Viscumitol is a cyclitol. It is a dimethyl-ether of muco-inositol that can be isolated from Viscum album.

References

Cyclitols
Methoxy compounds